Duccia Camiciotti (19 March 1928 – 7 July 2014) was an Italian poet, writer and essayist.

Studies and early life
Camiciotti's studies were founded in the Classics. She attended Silvio d’Amico Academy of Dramatic Arts (Silvio d’Amico Accademia d’Arte Drammatica) under the guidance of director Orazio Costa. She graduated with a degree in journalism from the University of Urbino, where she attended the school of literary and aesthetic criticism of humanist Carlo Bo. She became a teacher of Aesthetics at the Sharoff-Staniwslawskji Theater Academy in Rome, Italy.

Camiciotti met her husband, Claudio Battistich, in Florence, Italy, where she was his assistant as Director of the Center for Oriental Studies.

Camiciotti is an Executive Advisor and President of the Camerata dei Poeti, the city of Florence's Chamber of poetry in the tradition of the Florentine Camerata, and on the Board of Advisors of the Modigliani Art Center of Scandicci. Her five poetry collections have won cultural prizes. Her work has been reviewed by leading Italian newspapers such as La Nazione, Il Giornale, the Corriere di Firenze, and Poesia. 
In 2010 he starred in the literary artistic encounter "From Florence to the Stars" organized by La Pergola Arte Florence Art and curated by Peter Michael Musone to the Regional Council of Tuscany with book of poetry "The Last Anomalous Wave".
A resident of Florence, Italy, her poetry has been presented in readings with contemporaries Alda Merini, Maria Luisa Spaziani, and Mario Luzi, and she traveled to Moscow, Russia for cultural literary events with Russian poet Eugene Evtushenko in association with Russia's Minister of Foreign Culture.

Bibliography

Published works

Anthologies
 Slanci e partecipazione (Impulse and Sharing); Bastogi Editors

Periodicals and magazines
 Pegasus (Art Director, Contributing Editor)
 Città di Vita (City Life) (Editorial Board)
 Alla bottega (To the Store)
 Angeli e Poeti (Angels and Poets)
 Milano
 Orizzonti (Horizons) (Rome, Italy)

Awards and honors
 2008 Sacravita Poetry Prize
 1999 Ibiskos Prize (for Recurring Dream) Turin Book Fair
 Habere Artem prize ("Sangrila", Aletti publishers)
 Brunellesco Prize (La Donna Nell'arte)
 Romena Prize
 Casentino Prize

References

External links
 

1928 births
2014 deaths
People from Bracciano
Italian essayists
Italian women essayists
Italian women poets
20th-century Italian poets
20th-century Italian women writers
20th-century essayists